Keepit Power Station is a hydro-electric power station located at the Keepit Dam on the Namoi River, near Gunnedah in the North West Slopes region of New South Wales, Australia. The power station is operated by Meridian Energy and generated  of net energy production during 2009, used primarily for peak-load generation.

Location and features
The power station was completed in 1960, running one  turbine. In 1983, this turbine was upgraded to its present level.

See also

 List of hydro-electric power stations in New South Wales

References 

Energy infrastructure completed in 1960
Hydroelectric power stations in New South Wales
North West Slopes